The Middle Arm Point Formation is a Tremadocian formation cropping out in Western Newfoundland, containing arthropod embryos preserved in the Orsten fashion.

References

Tremadocian
Geology of Newfoundland and Labrador